"Saba, you rise from the ocean" is the regional song of the Caribbean island Saba, a special municipality of the Netherlands. The anthem was written and composed by Christina Maria Jeurissen, a Dominican nun, in 1960. It was established by the Island Council on 6 December 1985 and officially ratified on 10 October 2010.

Lyrics

References 

North American anthems
Culture of Saba (island)
1960 songs
Dutch anthems
National anthems